Saint Iehudiel ( Yaḥdīʾēl, "God is One") is one of the seven Archangels in Eastern Orthodox tradition and in the eastern rites of the Catholic Church.

Iconography

He is often depicted in iconography holding a crown and a three-thonged whip in hand, which symbolizes reward from God for the righteous and punishment for the sinners. The classic Eastern Orthodox depiction usually shows him standing upright, holding a crown in his right hand, and a rod or staff in his left hand.

Patronage

Jegudiel is the patron of all who work in some field of endeavor, and the crown he holds symbolizes the reward for successful spiritual labors.

Along with his subordinate angels, he is the advisor and defender of all who work in positions of responsibility to the glory of God, and as such is resorted to by kings, judges, and others in positions of leadership. Iehudiel is also known as the bearer of God's merciful love and also angel over Friday. Considered one of the seven archangels in a variant Catholic system, which pairs each archangel with a specific day of the week and attribute. With regard to the history of the archangel's name, it is thought to have first been mentioned in the non canonical Book of Enoch between 130 BC and 68 AD. Shortly thereafter and depending on the nationality of first Christians, he was called Iehudiel.

Prayers

A prayer to Iehudiel as the Patron Saint of hard work and leadership is as follows:

Saint Iehudiel the Archangel, angel of praise to God, pray for us, that in every act, in every job, in every work, and in every labor we may constantly carry out the will of the Lord gladly and in praise for all He has given us.  Amen.

A prayer to Iehudiel as the Patron Saint of God's Mercy follows as:

O merciful Archangel, St. Iehudiel, dispenser of God’s eternal and abundant Mercy. Because of our sinfulness, we do not deserve God’s forgiveness. Yet, He continually grants us forbearance freely and lovingly. Help us in our determination to overcome our sinful habits and be truly sorry for them. Bring each one of us to true conversion of heart. That we may experience  the joy of reconciliation which it brings, without which neither we, as individuals, nor the whole world can know true peace. Thou who dost continually intercede for us, listen to our prayers. Present to God the Father all of these petitions. We ask this through our Lord Jesus Christ, Who lives and reigns with the Father, in the unity of the Holy Spirit, one God, forever and ever. Amen.

See also 
 List of angels in theology

References

External links
 Chaplet of Saint Jehudiel the Archangel
 Catholic Faith Warriors

Archangels
Archangels in Christianity
Angels in Christianity
Individual angels
Eastern Catholic saints
Eastern Orthodox saints